Tianwen is a Classical Chinese poem known in English as the Heavenly Questions.

Tianwen may also refer to:
 Tianwen-1, a 2020 Chinese space mission to Mars
 Tianwen-2, a planned Chinese asteroid sample-return mission
 Tianwen-3, a planned Chinese Mars sample-return mission
 Tianwen-4, a planned Chinese space mission to Jupiter and Uranus
 Tianwen, Miluo (天问街道), a subdistrict in Miluo City, Hunan province

See also
 Tian Wen (disambiguation)
 Wentian (disambiguation)